The grizzly or grizzly bear (Ursus arctos ssp.) is the great brown bear of North America.

Grizzly may also refer to:

Bears
 California grizzly (U. a. californicus), the recently extinct subspecies of CLADE IV in the Far West and symbol of the State of California
 Kodiak bear (U. a. middendorffi), the grizzly of Alaska's ABC islands, hybrid with the polar bear
 Mainland grizzly (U. a. horribilis), representing most of North America
 Mexican grizzly bear (Ursus arctos; formerly Ursus arctos nelsoni) is an extinct population of grizzly native to Mexico
 Peninsular grizzly (U. a. gyas), indigenous to Alaska's southwestern peninsula

Geography
 Grizzly Mountain (disambiguation)
 Grizzly Peak (disambiguation)
 Grizzly Butte, a volcano in British Columbia, Canada
 Grizzly Bay, San Francisco, California, United States
 Grizzly Creek (disambiguation)

Military
 AVGP Grizzly, a Canadian armoured personnel carrier
 Grizzly combat engineering vehicle, a combat engineering vehicle variant of the M1 Abrams tank
 Grizzly APC, an American armored personnel carrier
 KMW Grizzly, a German armored vehicle produced beginning 2007
 Yamaha Grizzly 600, a large utility all-terrain vehicle
 Grizzly I cruiser tank, a Canadian-built M4A1 Sherman tank variant
 Airbus A400M "Grizzly", a military transport aircraft
 Beechcraft XA-38 Grizzly, a prototype World War II ground attack aircraft
 Boeing EA-18G Growler, American carrier-based electronic warfare aircraft, whose radio name during flight operations is be "Grizzly"
 Buk missile system, the versions Buk-M1-2 and Buk-M2 had the NATO reporting name of SA-17 "Grizzly"
 Grizzly, the nickname of the 40th Armored Division (United States)
 Forward Operating Base Grizzly, a former US Army base within Camp Ashraf, Iraq

Arts and entertainment
 Grizzly (film), a 1976 horror film
 Into the Grizzly Maze, a 2014 action film briefly called Grizzly during production
 Grizzly (We Bare Bears), fictional grizzly bear character
 Grizzly (comics), four unrelated Marvel Comics characters
 Grizzly (novel), a novel in Gary Paulsen's World of Adventure series
 The Grizzly (novel), a 1964 coming-of-age young adult adventure novel by Annabel and Edgar Johnson
 GRIZZLY (studio), a Japanese animation studio
 The Grizzly, a minor musical side project of Adam Young
 Task Force Grizzly, a USMC Force Recon task force in the video game Medal of Honor: Warfighter

Roller coasters
 Grizzly (Kings Dominion), a wooden roller coaster at Kings Dominion, Doswell, Virginia
 The Grizzly, a wooden roller coaster at California's Great America
 Grizzly, the previous name of the Timber Terror, a wooden roller coaster at Silverwood Theme Park

People
 James "Grizzly" Adams (1812–1860), American mountain man
 Rick "Grizzly" Brown (1960-2002), American participant in the 1985 and 1986 World's Strongest Man competitions

Other uses
 Grizzly (tobacco)
 LAR Grizzly Win Mag, a handgun
 Grizzly (.22-caliber rifle), a 3D printed rifle
 Rutan Grizzly, a tandem-wing STOL research aircraft designed by Burt Rutan, first flown in 1982
 Project Grizzly (software), a webserver component of the GlassFish Java EE Server
 Grizzly screen, a grid used for separating rocks of different size

See also
 Grizzly bear (disambiguation)
 Grizzlies (disambiguation), a list of sports teams
 Grizzley, surname
 Grizzle, a surname
 Grizzy (disambiguation)
 Grizz (disambiguation)